The 2000–2001 LEB season was the 5th season of the Liga Española de Baloncesto, second tier of the Spanish basketball.

LEB standings

LEB Oro Playoffs
The two winners of the semifinals are promoted to Liga ACB.

Relegation playoffs

Badajoz Caja Rural and Abeconsa Ferrol, relegated to LEB-2.

References
All scores on FEB.es

See also 
Liga Española de Baloncesto

LEB2
LEB Oro seasons
Second level Spanish basketball league seasons